These hits topped the Dutch Top 40 in 1994 (see 1994 in music).

See also
1994 in music

1994 in the Netherlands
1994 record charts
1994